Mitchell A. Dubow was a 20th-century American labor lawyer, later Judge of District Court, Sixth Judicial District for the State of Minnesota.

On September 9, 1948, Dubow appeared with Joseph Forer as co-counsel for Maurice Louis Braverman, himself counsel for Mr. and Mrs. William Rosen, who testified about the Ford car involved in the Hiss-Chambers Case.  He stated his address as "705 Knickerbocker Building in Baltimore."

In 1950, Dubow's name and address (705 Knickerbocker Building, Baltimore) appeared in a HUAC investigative report, showing him as a member of the National Lawyers Guild.

On November 11, 1966, Dubow began so serve as Judge of District Court, Sixth Judicial District, State of Minnesota.  In February 1989, Judge Dubow applied for disability retirement.  Minnesota Governor Rudy Perpich granted his application, effective March 31, 1989.

See also

 Alger Hiss
 Whittaker Chambers
 Minnesota District Courts

References

Minnesota state court judges
Year of birth missing
Year of death missing
Place of birth missing
Place of death missing